A-esterase may refer to one of two enzymes:
Arylesterase
Aryldialkylphosphatase